Beryl Markham: A Shadow on the Sun is a 1988 American-British TV mini-series starring Stefanie Powers and Jack Thompson. It was directed by Tony Richardson and was written by journalist James Fox and screenwriter Allan Scott, based on interviews Fox conducted when researching White Mischief. It was filmed on location in Limuru, Kenya. It traces Beryl's life from a 20-year-old equestrian to a lonely 82-year-old and focuses more on her personal life than her achievements as an aviator.

Cast
Stefanie Powers as Beryl Markham
Claire Bloom as Gwladys, Lady Delamere
Peter Bowles as Lord John (Jack) Carberry
Trevor Eve as Denys Finch Hatton
James Fox as Mansfield Markham, Beryl Markham's second husband
Frederic Forrest as Raoul Schumacher, Markham's third husband
Jack Thompson as Tom Campbell Black

Reception
The Globe and Mail said "Although the film includes daring flying exploits and exciting racetrack scenes, it focuses on Markham's enigmatic personal life. The Los Angeles Times said the series included "frequent, evasive shallowness" and seemed to rely a lot on Markham's own recollections and point of view, but that "Powers gives the performance of her life". The New York Times agrees that "Ms. Powers is certainly an inspired choice for the lead role" but that "the film occasionally turns irritatingly sketchy." It concludes though that the series "is nearly always intriguing and, thanks to Steve Yaconelli's photography, decidedly handsome. People magazine likewise described the film as "a series of biographical vignettes, not as a cohesive drama".

References

External links

1988 television films
1988 films